Antje von Dewitz (born 18 September 1972 in Ebingen) is a German entrepreneur. She is the managing director of the company VAUDE, a producer of mountain sports equipment based in Tettnang. She holds 46% of the company's shares.

Family and early life
Antje von Dewitz grew up in Untereisenbach near Tettnang. She is the second of the three daughters of Albrecht von Dewitz who founded the family business VAUDE in 1974. The family is a branch of the originally Mecklenburg-Pomeranian aristocratic family von Dewitz.
Antje spent one of her final school years in Chattanooga, Tennessee, as part of an exchange program. While there, she attended Baylor School.
Antje von Dewitz lives in Tettnang with her partner and their four children.

Studies and career
Von Dewitz studied economics and cultural studies at the University of Passau. She graduated in 1998. During her studies, Dewitz rather wanted to work in the field of environmental protection and had initially not planned to enter the company of her father. Since 1998, when she was first employed by VAUDE as an intern, she built up the Bags and Travel Bag area. From 2000 to 2002, she was responsible for public relations, and in 2005 she took over the entire marketing management.
During the period from 2002 to 2005, she was also partly employed as a research assistant at the University of Stuttgart-Hohenheim, where she wrote a dissertation titled High-performance employment relationships in medium-sized companies. She completed her doctorate in 2005. In 2009 Albrecht von Dewitz handed over the management to her.
Since then, Dewitz has increasingly been setting up more and more processes in the company on criteria of sustainability and environmental compatibility. This should also be done along the whole value-added chain, that is throughout the logistics chain and in the case of subcontractors abroad.

Economic and political positions
In 2020, Antje von Dewitz supported the passage of a German supply chain law to ensure higher ethical and ecological standards in international sourcing for the German economy. To lend more weight to this cause, she collaborated with federal minister Gerd Müller of the conservative Christian Social Union in Bavaria.

Von Dewitz advocates that the guidelines for the Economy for the Common Good should be given more importance and criticizes the fact that in business attention is only paid to financial ratios. Together with political activist Christian Felber, she achieved that in 2015, the European Economic and Social Committee declared itself in favour of the economy of the common good and argued that it should be integrated into both European and national legal frameworks.

Von Dewitz was an Alliance 90/The Greens delegate to the Federal Convention for the purpose of electing the President of Germany in 2017.

Other activities

Corporate boards
 Beitlich Family Foundation, Member of the Board (since 2014)
 Landesbank Baden-Württemberg (LBBW), Member of the Advisory Board

Non-profit organizations
 Naturkapital Deutschland (project of the Helmholtz Centre for Environmental Research), Member of the Project Advisory Board
 European Outdoor Group, Vice President
 German Federal Foundation for the Environment (DBU), Member of the Board of Trustees

Recognition
 2021 - Chief Marketing Officer of the Year
 2021 - business award Ernst & Young Entrepreneur of the Year in the category of sustainability
 2021 - GEM Award for sustainable brand management from the Gesellschaft zur Erforschung des Markenwesens (=Society for Research into Branding)
 2018 – Brand Manager of the Year, German Brand Award
 2017 – Order of Merit of Baden-Württemberg
 2017 – Handelsblatt Hall of Fame of Family Businesses
 2012 – B.A.U.M. Environmental Award
 2011 – Top Business Women 2011 in the category Top Entrepreneur of Financial Times Germany
 2011 – Economic Medal of the State of Baden-Württemberg

References

External links
Interview within the program Typisch deutsch as part of Deutsche Welle; accessed February 6, 2017 in the ARD Media Library (in German)

1972 births
Living people
German business executives
21st-century German businesswomen
21st-century German businesspeople
University of Passau alumni
Recipients of the Order of Merit of Baden-Württemberg